Below is the history of the expansion of the Moscow Metro in Moscow, Russia.

The line number only reflects the section it serves today. The original line the station served at the time of opening may be different due to lines being divided, shifted to or merged with other lines afterwards.

Timeline list

Graphic timeline

References

Moscow Metro
History of Moscow
Moscow-related lists